The Calendar is a 1931 British drama film directed by T. Hayes Hunter and starring Herbert Marshall, Edna Best and Anne Grey. Racehorse owner Anson is swindled by a woman named Wenda and goes up in front of the Jockey Club where he is disqualified on race fixing allegations. He decides to get his own back with the help of Hillcott, an ex-burglar. Jill is the love interest. It was released as Bachelor's Folly in the United States.

The film was made at Beaconsfield Studios. It was based on The Calendar, a 1929 play and subsequent novel by Edgar Wallace. A remake was released in 1948.

Cast
 Herbert Marshall as Gerry Anson
 Edna Best as Jill Panniford
 Anne Grey as Wenda Panniford
 Gordon Harker as Sam Hillcott
 Nigel Bruce as Lord Willie Panniford
 Alfred Drayton as John Dory
 Leslie Perrins as Henry Lascarne
 Allan Aynesworth as Edmund Garth
 Melville Cooper as Mr. Wayne  
 John Charlton as Swell  
 J.B. Spendlove  as Jockey

References

Bibliography
Wood, Linda. British Films, 1927–1939. British Film Institute, 1986.

External links

1931 films
1931 drama films
British drama films
Films based on works by Edgar Wallace
Films directed by T. Hayes Hunter
British horse racing films
British black-and-white films
Films set in England
Gainsborough Pictures films
Films shot at Beaconsfield Studios
1930s English-language films
1930s British films